Ballad for Americans is a studio album of phonograph records by Bing Crosby released in 1940 featuring the popular "Ballad for Americans" sung by Crosby in an American-type patriotic style. In 1946, the two records in this album were put into a new album called What We So Proudly Hail. This was Crosby's first studio album that was not a reissue of earlier singles.

Reception
Crosby biographer Gary Giddins discussed the recording in his book Bing Crosby, A Pocketful of Dreams, The Early Years, 1903-1940:
Bing did not approach the project lightly. He studied the work before the session, and his concentration in the studio was painstaking; everything had to be right. In contrast to his usual speed (five tunes in two hours, rarely more than two takes), he devoted an hour to each of the four segments. If the reviews were not overtly political, political righteousness fueled the cheers of latecomers to the world of popular music.

"Bing Crosby came of age, musically speaking, in his last week’s album, Ballad for Americans," wrote New York Post critic Michael Levin. "This is the finest recorded performance Bing had done to date and shows that in the last few years he has gone beyond binging and has really learned how to sing." When he finished patronizing Bing, Levin chanced a risky comparison with Paul Robeson’s Victor set that undoubtedly gladdened the hearts of Kapp’s team: "For all of Robeson's magnificent voice, we prefer the Crosby version. The recording is better, the orchestration is better, and the chorus is better trained."

Track listing
These newly issued songs were featured on a 2-disc, 78 rpm album set, Decca Album No. A-134.  "Ballad for Americans" was written by John Treville Latouche and Earl Robinson.  Crosby's recordings were made on July 6, 1940, with the Ken Darby Singers and Victor Young's Decca Concert Orchestra.

Disc 1 (3297): "Part One" (2:26) / "Part Four" (3:06)
Disc 2 (3298): "Part Two" (2:16) / "Part Three" (2:24)

References

Bing Crosby albums
1940 albums
Decca Records albums